Abuʾl-Ḥārith Arslān al-Muẓaffar al-Basāsīrī (died 15 January 1059) was a Turkish slave-soldier (mamlūk) who rose to become a military commander of the Buwayhid dynasty in Iraq. When the Buwayhids were ousted by the Seljuks in 1055, he transferred his allegiance to the Fatimid Caliphate of Egypt, in whose name he conquered Baghdad, which he ruled for almost a year.

Early years
The name al-Basāsīrī (or al-Fasāsīrī, al-Fasāwī) is a nisba derived from his first owner's place of origin, Basā (Fasā) in the province of Fars. Abuʾl-Ḥārith is a kunya, while his ism (given name) was the Turkish Arslān. He became a freedman (mawlā) of the Buwayhid emir Baha al-Dawla. His military career, however, can be traced only from the reign of Baha's son, Jalal al-Dawla.

Al-Basasiri took part in Jalal's conflicts with his nephew, Abu Kalijar, the emir of Fars, and with the rival Uqaylid dynasty of Mosul. He was also a favourite of the Buwayhid emir al-Malik al-Rahim, from whom he received the town of Anbar as a fief. This was a period of growing unrest among the Turkish troops in Baghdad, growing strife between Sunni and Shi'a, constant Kurdish raiding and the ongoing war with the Uqaylids.

Conflict with the vizier, 1054–55
In 1054, al-Basasiri was unable to prevent Turkish troops from rioting and looting in Baghdad. In the same year the Uqaylid leader Quraysh raided Baradan and carried off al-Basasiri's camels and horses. In November, Quraysh captured Anbar and formally renounced Buwayhid lordship, ordering the Seljuk sultan Tughrul to be named in the public sermon (khuṭba) during Friday prayer.

According to Ibn al-Athir's Complete History, "the estrangement of the [Abbasid] caliph and Basasiri began this year in Ramadan", that is, between 4 December 1054 and 2 January 1055. In 1054, al-Basasiri fell out with the caliphal vizier Ibn al-Muslima over Turkish policy. He accused the vizier of being in contact with Tughrul since 1052/3. Ibn al-Muslima in turn blocked al-Basasiri's efforts to combat Quraysh's supporters in Baghdad. In retaliation, al-Basasiri impounded the vizier's boat and cut off his monthly stipend. He also cut off the caliph al-Qa'im's monthly subsidy.

In March 1055 al-Basasiri reconquered Anbar. On his way he plundered the villages of Dimimma and Fallujah. He was joined by his brother-in-law, Dubays I of the Mazyadid dynasty. Anbar was defended by the Uqaylid client Abu'l-Ghana'im ibn al-Muhallaban. Al-Basasiri, employing trebuchets and Greek fire, destroyed a tower and some defensive works. The town was stormed and Abu'l-Ghana'im was captured along a hundred Khafaja soldiers.

The conflict with the vizier continued after al-Basasiri's return to Baghdad. In July 1055, during a Sunni protest, the vizier convinced some fanatics to board a ship and break some wine jars belonging to a Christian merchant and destined for al-Basasiri, then staying at Wasit with the Buwayhid sultan. Because the wine had belonged to a Christian, al-Basasiri was able to obtain a Hanadi legal ruling (fatwā) declaring the vizier's actions illegal. Ibn al-Muslima then denounced him as having Shi'a sympathies and being in contact with the Abbasids' rivals, the Shi'a Fatimid Caliphate. He turned the Turkish troops and the caliph against him, and had his house in Baghdad burnt down. In fact, although the Fatimid chief missionary al-Mu'ayyad fi'l-Din al-Shirazi wrote to al-Basasiri, his letters did not reach him until after the arrival of Tughrul in Baghdad.

Ibn al-Muslima ordered the sultan al-Malik al-Rahim to send his favourite away, but the sultan refused. On 15 December 1055, the name of Tughrul, who was nominally passing through on his pilgrimage (ḥajj) to Mecca, was pronounced in the khuṭba in Baghdad. On 18 December, he solemnly entered the city. The presence of his troops sparked disorders, and he arrested the Buwayhid sultan on 23 December for failing to control the people. Although al-Malik al-Rahim returned to Baghdad from Wāsiṭ to greet Tughrul, al-Basasiri went to the court of his brother-in-law, Dubays. Tughrul ordered Dubays to disassociate with al-Basasiri, and the latter went to Rahba.

In Fatimid service against the Seljuks, 1055–59

Governor of Rahba
From Rahba, al-Basasiri wrote to the Fatimid caliph al-Mustansir for permission to come to Cairo and for assistance in defending Syria and Egypt from the Seljuks. The Fatimid vizier al-Yazuri refused the first request, but granted the second. Al-Basasiri was appointed governor of Rahba, and the caliph sent him  gold dinars, clothing valued at  dinars,  bows,  swords, 500 horses and a quantity of lances and arrows. Al-Mu'ayyad accompanied the supplies and brought the letter of investiture.

In 1056–57, al-Mu'ayyad won several Syrian and Iraqi emirs over to the Fatimid cause. Dubays, al-Basasiri's former protector, who had submitted to Tughrul, changed allegiance and had the Fatimid caliph's name pronounced in the khuṭba. He renewed his alliance with al-Basasiri. The Baghdadi Turks, who had been a thorn in the side of al-Basasiri in previous years, found the rule of Tughrul intolerable and joined al-Basasiri in Syria. The army of al-Basasiri and Dubays, reinforced by the Turks and some Bedouin, marched on Sinjar, where they defeated a Seljuk force under Qutalmish and Quraysh. While Qutalmish escaped capture and fled to Adharbayjan, Quraysh was injured and surrendered on 9 January 1057.

After his victory at Sinjar, al-Basasiri entered Mosul and the city declared for the Fatimid caliph. This situation only lasted a few days. Tughrul soon recaptured Mosul and set about devastating the region of Sinjar, while al-Basasiri retreated to Rahba. Dubays and Quraysh temporarily switched sides again, but the anti-Arab sentiment in the Seljuk camp repulsed them. Dubays went to Jami'an and Quraysh joined al-Basasiri at Rahba.

In early 1058, Tughrul's brother Ibrahim Inal entered into an agreement with al-Basasiri and al-Mu'ayyad, whereby the latter would support him in usurping his brother's throne and he would proclaim the name of the Fatimid caliph in the khuṭba. He abandoned Mosul to al-Basasiri, who still had to spend four months besieging the citadel before it surrendered. After capturing the citadel, al-Basasiri retired to Rahba. Again his victory did not last. Tughrul soon retook Mosul and marched on Nisibis. Al-Basasiri retreated to Damascus.

Conquest of Baghdad
During al-Basasiri's retreat, Ibrahim rose in revolt in the Jibal. Tughrul's response largely denuded Iraq of Seljuk troops, allowing al-Basasiri to launch an invasion. He quickly took Hit and Anbar. On 27 December 1058, he entered Baghdad with 400 mamlūk cavalry accompanied by Quraysh and his 200 cavalry. The next Friday, 1 January 1059, the Shi'a call to worship (adhān) was announced in western Baghdad, which was predominantly Shi'a. On 8 January, al-Basasiri crossed the Tigris and occupied eastern Baghdad. The name of the Fatimid caliph was pronounced in the Great Mosque. There skirmishes in the streets throughout the following week. On 19 January, the Hasani Palace was assaulted and the Abbasid caliph al-Qa'im placed himself and his household under the protection of Quraysh. On 29 January, al-Basasiri celebrated the Feast of the Sacrifice in the prayer space (muṣallā) outside the Great Mosque with Fatimid banners flying.

As the new authority in Baghdad, al-Basasiri took over the Abbasid insignia, the turban (mindīl), cloak (ridāʾ) and lattice screen (shibbāk). He allowed Quraysh to retain custody of al-Qa'im, removed from the city and confined at Haditha, but he ordered him to hand over the vizier Ibn al-Muslima, whom he paraded through the streets and executed on 16 February 1059.

Al-Basasiri followed up his conquest of Baghdad by taking Wasit and Basra. His invasion of Khuzistan, however, was repelled. The ruler of Khuzistan, Hazarasp ibn Bankir, asked Dubays to mediate with al-Basasiri. He offered to pay tribute to al-Basasiri, but the latter refused demanding that the khuṭba and the coinage be made in the name of the Fatimid caliph. Hazarasp refused this. When al-Basasiri realised that he was receiving troops from Tughrul, he made peace with him and retired to Wasit, which he reached on the 12 September 1059.

In July 1059, Tughrul defeated his brother. He offered to leave al-Basasiri in power in Baghdad provided the khuṭba and the coinage were in his name and the Abbasid caliph was restored. Al-Basasiri tried to pry al-Qa'im away from the Seljuks, but the caliph refused. Quraysh tried to convince al-Basasiri to accept Tughrul's authority, but he refused. Tughrul marched on Baghdad. Al-Basasiri abandoned the city with his family on 14 December 1059. Tughrul and the Abbasid caliph entered it on 4 January 1060. The Fatimid name was said to have been pronounced in the khuṭba in Baghdad's mosques forty times, meaning that the rule of al-Basasiri in Baghdad lasted forty Fridays.

Al-Basasiri headed towards Kufa and joined up with Dubays. When the Seljuk cavalry overtook them, Dubays fled but al-Basasiri offered battle. On 15 January, at Saḳy al-Furat near Kufa, he was defeated and killed. His horse was first killed under him by an arrow and he was then killed by the clerk of the Seljuk vizier al-Kunduri. His head was brought to Tughrul at Baghdad.

References

Sources

Further reading
 

1059 deaths
11th-century people from the Abbasid Caliphate
Buyid generals
Generals of the Fatimid Caliphate
Ghilman
Slaves of the Buyid dynasty
Governors of the Fatimid Caliphate
Iraqi rebels
Military personnel killed in action
Year of birth unknown
Fatimid ghilman